Carinotrachia admirale is a species of air-breathing land snail, a terrestrial pulmonate gastropod mollusk in the family Camaenidae.

The specific name admirale refers to Admiralty Gulf which is next to the islands where this species lives.

Subspecies 
 Carinotrachia admirale admirale Köhler, 2010
 Carinotrachia admirale elevata Köhler, 2010

Distribution 
The distribution of Carinotrachia admirale includes Middle and Southwest Osborn Islands.

The type locality of Carinotrachia admirale is Middle Osborn Island, Bonaparte Archipelago in north-western Kimberley, Western Australia.

References 

Camaenidae
Gastropods described in 2010